Conchita Martínez was the defending champion but lost in the semifinals to Kimiko Date.

Date won in the final 3–6, 6–3, 6–0 against Arantxa Sánchez Vicario.

Seeds
A champion seed is indicated in bold text while text in italics indicates the round in which that seed was eliminated. The top four seeds received a bye to the second round.

  Arantxa Sánchez Vicario (final)
  Conchita Martínez (semifinals)
  Jana Novotná (semifinals)
  Kimiko Date (champion)
  Gabriela Sabatini (quarterfinals)
  Karina Habšudová (second round)
  Ai Sugiyama (second round)
  Nathalie Tauziat (quarterfinals)

Draw

Final

Section 1

Section 2

External links
 1996 Toshiba Classic draw

Southern California Open
1996 WTA Tour